Safe and Sound or Safe & Sound may refer to:

Music

Albums
Safe + Sound, a 1995 album by DJ Quik
Safe & Sound (album), a 2006 album by Juneau

Songs
"Safe and Sound" (Capital Cities song), 2011
"Safe & Sound" (Taylor Swift song), 2012, featuring The Civil Wars from the film The Hunger Games
"Safe and Sound" (Justice song), 2016 
"Safe and Sound", a song by Azure Ray from their 2001 album Azure Ray
"Safe and Sound", a song by Electric President from the album The Violent Blue
"Safe & Sound", a song by Five Man Electrical Band from their 1971 album Good-byes and Butterflies
"Safe and Sound", a song by Godsmack from their 2006 album IV
"Safe and Sound", a song by Hawksley Workman from the 1999 album For Him and the Girls
"Safe and Sound", a song by Hunter (now Cunter) from their 2009 extended play 8
"Safe and Sound", a song by Idlewild from their 1998 album Hope Is Important
"Safe and Sound", a song by Kyosuke Himuro featuring Gerard Way for the 2009 film release Final Fantasy VII Advent Children Complete
"Safe and Sound", a song by MercyMe from their 2006 album Coming Up to Breathe
"Safe and Sound", a song by French singer Nolwenn Leroy from her 2009 album Le Cheshire Cat et moi
"Safe and Sound", a song by Rebelution from their 2007 album Courage to Grow
"Safe and Sound", a song by Sheryl Crow from her 2002 album C'mon, C'mon
"Safe and Sound", a song by Different Heaven, A Non-Copyright song. Uploaded on YouTube by NoCopyrightSounds, 2016

Other
"Safe & Sound" (Prison Break), a 2008 episode of TV series Prison Break
"Safe and Sound", a 2017 episode of anthology TV series Philip K. Dick's Electric Dreams

See also
Safe in Sound (disambiguation)